Soaking, also known as marinating or floating, is a sexual practice of inserting the penis into the vagina but not subsequently thrusting, reportedly used by some members of the Church of Jesus Christ of Latter-day Saints (LDS Church). It serves as a purported loophole to the Mormon denomination's law of chastity which states that all sex outside of a heterosexual marriage is a sin.

The practice is said to sometimes be accompanied by "jump humping", in which a third person is invited to bounce on the bed (or to push up on the mattress from below) for a couple engaged in soaking, thus generating motion for them. This allegedly absolves the soaking couple from responsibility for any genital movement. The "jump hump" assistant has been termed the "bed jumper" or "Provo pusher" (after Provo, Utah, home of the church's largest university). Other definitions of "provo push" refer to it as clothed or unclothed, non-penetrative dry humping or sexual grinding between church members.

Some Mormons have said that soaking is an urban legend and not an actual practice by members of the LDS church. Others have stated they knew church members who had soaked. In 2021, a video about soaking went viral on TikTok. The practice also received mentions in the television series Alpha House and Get Shorty.

See also
 Coitus reservatus
 Poophole Loophole
 Saddlebacking
 Sexuality and the LDS Church
 Technical virgin

References 

Sexual slang
Sexual acts
Sexuality and Mormonism